Dowlatabad (also Romanized as Dowlatābād) is a village in Mazkureh Rural District, in the Central District of Sari County, Mazandaran Province, Iran. At the 2006 census, its population was 531, in 137 families.

References 

Populated places in Sari County